News18 Kannada is a Kannada news channel from ETV Network and owned by Reliance Network 18, which went live on 20 March 2014.
Initially, it used to be broadcast from the Hyderabad studio, until 2014 general elections, when the channel shifted its base to Bengaluru and set up five or six bureaus in the state. It was branded ETV News Kannada till September 28, 2017.

See also
List of Kannada-language television channels
Television in India
Media in Karnataka
Media of India

References

External links 
 

Kannada-language television channels
24-hour television news channels in India
Television stations in Bangalore
Television channels and stations established in 2015
2014 establishments in Telangana